The CCC Company 741 Powder Magazine Historic District encompasses two structures built by Camp 741 of the Civilian Conservation Corps c. 1936. The camp, the first established in Arkansas, used these structures to store explosive materials used in road and bridge construction projects. The two structures have concrete bases and tops, and have walls of cut fieldstone and concrete.

The buildings were listed on the National Register of Historic Places in 2007.

See also
National Register of Historic Places listings in Montgomery County, Arkansas

References

Ouachita National Forest
National Register of Historic Places in Montgomery County, Arkansas
Civilian Conservation Corps in Arkansas
1936 establishments in Arkansas
Gunpowder magazines
Government buildings completed in 1936